An annular solar eclipse occurred on April 8, 1959. A solar eclipse occurs when the Moon passes between Earth and the Sun, thereby totally or partly obscuring the image of the Sun for a viewer on Earth. An annular solar eclipse occurs when the Moon's apparent diameter is smaller than the Sun's, blocking most of the Sun's light and causing the Sun to look like an annulus (ring). An annular eclipse appears as a partial eclipse over a region of the Earth thousands of kilometres wide. Annularity was visible from Australia, southeastern tip of Milne Bay Province in the Territory of Papua New Guinea (today's Papua New Guinea), British Solomon Islands (today's Solomon Islands), Gilbert and Ellice Islands (the part now belonging to Tuvalu), Tokelau, and Swains Island in American Samoa.

Related eclipses

Solar eclipses of 1957–1960

Saros 138 
It is a part of Saros cycle 138, repeating every 18 years, 11 days, containing 70 events. The series started with partial solar eclipse on June 6, 1472. It contains annular eclipses from August 31, 1598, through February 18, 2482 with a hybrid eclipse on March 1, 2500. It has total eclipses from March 12, 2518, through April 3, 2554. The series ends at member 70 as a partial eclipse on July 11, 2716. The longest duration of totality will be only 56 seconds on April 3, 2554.
<noinclude>

Tritos series

Inex series

Metonic series

Notes

References

1959 4 9
1959 in science
1959 4 9
April 1959 events